Primarily obsessional obsessive–compulsive disorder, also known as purely obsessional obsessive–compulsive disorder (Pure O), is a lesser-known form or manifestation of OCD. It is not a diagnosis in the DSM-5. For people with primarily obsessional OCD, there are fewer observable compulsions, compared to those commonly seen with the typical form of OCD (checking, counting, hand-washing, etc.). While ritualizing and neutralizing behaviors do take place, they are mostly cognitive in nature, involving mental avoidance and excessive rumination. Primarily obsessional OCD takes the form of intrusive thoughts of a distressing or violent nature (e.g., fear of acting on impulses).

According to the DSM-5, "The obsessive-compulsive and related disorders differ from developmentally normative preoccupations and rituals by being excessive or persisting beyond developmentally appropriate periods. The distinction between the presence of subclinical symptoms and a clinical disorder requires assessment of a number of factors, including the individual's level of distress and impairment in functioning."

Presentation
Primarily obsessional OCD has been called "one of the most distressing and challenging forms of OCD." People with this form of OCD have "distressing and unwanted thoughts pop into [their] head frequently," and the thoughts "typically center on a fear that you may do something totally uncharacteristic of yourself, something... potentially fatal... to yourself or others." The thoughts "quite likely, are of an aggressive or sexual nature."

The nature and type of primarily obsessional OCD vary greatly, but the central theme for all affected is the emergence of a disturbing, intrusive thought or question, an unwanted/inappropriate mental image, or a frightening impulse that causes the person extreme anxiety because it is antithetical to closely held religious beliefs, morals, or societal norms. The fears associated with primarily obsessional OCD tend to be far more personal and terrifying for the affected individual than the fears of someone with traditional OCD. Pure-O fears usually focus on self-devastating scenarios that they feel would ruin their life or the lives of those around them. An example of this difference could be that someone with traditional OCD is overly concerned or worried about security or cleanliness, whereas someone with Pure-O may be terrified that they have undergone a radical change in their sexuality (e.g., might be or might have changed into a pedophile), that they might be a murderer, or that they might cause any form of harm to a loved one or an innocent person or to themselves, or that they will go insane.

They will understand that these fears are unlikely or even impossible but the anxiety felt will make the obsession seem real and meaningful. While those without primarily obsessional OCD might instinctively respond to bizarre, intrusive thoughts or impulses as insignificant and part of a normal variance in the human mind, someone with Pure-O will respond with profound alarm followed by an intense attempt to neutralize the thought or avoid having the thought again. The person begins to ask themselves constantly, "Am I really capable of something like that?" or "Could that really happen?" or "Is that really me?" (even though they usually realize that their fear is irrational, which causes them further distress) and puts tremendous effort into escaping or resolving the unwanted thought. They then end up in a vicious cycle of mentally searching for reassurance and trying to get a definitive answer.

Common intrusive thoughts/obsessions include themes of:
 Responsibility: with an excessive concern over someone's well-being marked specifically by guilt over believing they have harmed or might harm someone, either on purpose or inadvertently.
 Sexuality: including recurrent doubt over one's sexual orientation (also called HOCD or "homosexual OCD"). People with this theme typically display symptoms different from those of people experiencing an actual crisis in sexuality. One major difference is that people who have HOCD report being attracted sexually towards the opposite sex prior to the onset of HOCD, while homosexual people whether in the closet or repressed have always had such same-sex attractions. The question "Am I gay?" takes on a pathological form. Many people with this type of obsession are in healthy and fulfilling romantic relationships, either with members of the opposite sex, or the same sex (in which case their fear would be "Am I straight?").
 Pedophilia: Sexual themes in OCD can also involve the fear that one is a pedophile. This is typically accompanied by significant distress and fear that one might actually act on pedophilic urges.
 Violence: which involves a constant fear of harming oneself or loved ones.
 Religiosity: manifesting as intrusive thoughts or impulses revolving around blasphemous and sacrilegious themes.
 Health: including consistent fears of having or contracting a disease (different from hypochondriasis) through seemingly impossible means (for example, touching an object that has just been touched by someone with a disease) or mistrust of a diagnostic test.
 Relationship obsessions (ROCD): in which someone in a romantic relationship endlessly tries to ascertain the justification for being or remaining in that relationship. It includes obsessive thoughts such as "How do I know this is real love?", "How do I know he/she is the one?", "Am I attracted enough to this person?", "Am I in love with this person, or is it just lust?", "Does he/she really love me?", and/or obsessive preoccupation with the perceived flaws of the intimate partner. The agony of attempting to arrive at certainty leads to an intense and endless cycle of anxiety because it is impossible to arrive at a definite answer. The partner will have seriously troubling thoughts about what their significant other could be doing, especially in the possible and usual form of cheating. Although these thoughts are not triggered by the affected individual, and are indeed spontaneous, the partner will denigrate themselves for thinking in such a way that makes the other look bad. There is uncontrollable constant guilt, fear, and distressing thoughts of what will happen.
 Existential: involving persistent and obsessive questioning of the nature of self, reality, the universe, and/or other philosophical topics.

Diagnosis
There is no such diagnosis in DSM-5. The only diagnosis existing in DSM-5 is obsessive–compulsive disorder. According to DSM-5 compulsions can be mental, but they are always repetitive actions like "praying, counting, repeating words silently". DSM-5 does not have any information that searching an answer for some question can be associated with OCD.

Alternatives
Those with primarily obsessional OCD might appear normal and high-functioning, yet spend a great deal of time ruminating, trying to solve or answer any of the questions that cause them distress. Very often, individuals with Pure-O are dealing with considerable guilt and anxiety. Ruminations may include trying to think about something 'in the right way' in an attempt to relieve this distress.

For example, an intrusive thought "I could just kill Bill with this steak knife" is followed by a catastrophic misinterpretation of the thought, i.e. "How could I have such a thought? Deep down, I must be a psychopath." This might lead a person to continually surf the Internet, reading numerous articles on defining psychopathy. This reassurance-seeking ritual will provide no further clarification and could exacerbate the intensity of the search for the answer. There are numerous corresponding cognitive biases present, including thought-action fusion, over-importance of thoughts, and need for control over thoughts.

Treatment
The most effective treatment for primarily obsessional OCD appears to be cognitive-behavioral therapy (more specifically exposure and response prevention (ERP)) as well as cognitive therapy (CT) which may or may not be combined with the use of medication, such as SSRIs. People with OCD without overt compulsions are considered by some researchers to respond less to ERP compared to others with OCD and therefore ERP can prove less successful than CT.

Exposure and Response Prevention for Pure-O is theoretically based on the principles of classical conditioning and extinction. The spike (intrusive thought) often presents itself as a paramount question or disastrous scenario followed by a compulsive response of fear, worry, questioning and rumination.(e.g., WHAT IF I actually want to harm someone? WHAT IF I committed a sin?).

On the other hand, a therapeutic response (one that will help interrupt the cycle of obsessing) is one that answers the spike (intrusive thought) in a way that leaves ambiguity. With a therapeutic response, the subject accepts the possibility and is willing to take the risk, of the feared outcome rather than attempt to (temporarily and repeatedly) reassure oneself that the feared occurrence will not happen.

For example, the spike/intrusive thought would be, "Maybe I said something offensive to my boss yesterday." A recommended response would be, "Maybe I did. I'll live with the possibility and take the risk he'll fire me tomorrow." Although resisting the need to reassure oneself and perform compulsions will initially cause anxiety to increase, refusing to practice compulsions over an extended period of time will eventually cause anxiety around their intrusive thoughts to decrease, making them less prevalent (e.g. they will begin to occur less often), and less distressing when they do occur. Using this procedure, it is imperative that the distinction be made between the therapeutic response and non-therapeutic response (rumination). The therapeutic response does not seek to answer the question but to accept the uncertainty of the unsolved dilemma.

Acceptance and commitment therapy (ACT) is a newer approach that also is used to treat purely obsessional OCD, as well as other mental disorders such as anxiety and clinical depression. Mindfulness-based stress reduction (MBSR) may also be helpful for breaking out of rumination and interrupting the cycle of obsessing.

Notes and references

Bibliography
 The Imp of the Mind: Exploring the Silent Epidemic of Obsessive Bad Thoughts by Lee Baer, Ph.D.
 The Treatment of Obsessions (Medicine) by Stanley Rachman. Oxford University Press, 2003.
 Brain lock: Free yourself from obsessive-compulsive behavior: A four-step self-treatment method to change your brain chemistry by Jeffrey Schwartz and Beverly Beyette. New York: Regan Books, 1997. .
 The OCD Workbook by Bruce Hyman and Cherry Pedrick.
 Overcoming obsessive thoughts. How to gain control of your OCD by David A. Clark, Ph.D. and Christine Purdon, Ph.D.
 Mad Girl by Bryony Gordon. London: Headline, 2016. .

External links
 Am I Gay? Obsessive–Compulsive Disorder Takes Many Forms
 The International OCD Foundation
 ROCD Research Unit

Anxiety disorders
Obsessive–compulsive disorder